Episodes is the quarterly journal of the International Union of Geological Sciences, published in Seoul, Korea. In circulation since 1978, Episodes is an international and interdisciplinary open access and free, both to submit and download, publication journal that covers all geoscience disciplines. Episodes includes authoritative articles that reflect global research advances, evolving trends in geoscience disciplines and concise reports on the results of international meetings, conferences, and symposia. It is a high visibility journal, and is indexed in Science Citation Index (SCI), Science Citation Index Expanded (SCIE; Web of Science), and Journal Citation Reports (JCR)/Science Edition, along with many other databases such as SCOPUS. Submitted manuscripts are peer-reviewed, and a first decision is provided to authors approximately within 30 days after submission.

See also 
 List of scientific journals
 List of scientific journals in earth and atmospheric sciences

References

External links 
 
IUGS publications program, incorporating Episodes journal

Geology journals
Quarterly journals
Publications established in 1978